James Ernest "Buck" Karnes was a Sergeant in the United States Army who received the Medal of Honor for his actions near Estrees, France, on October 8, 1918, during World War I.

Biography
James Ernest "Buck" Karnes (July 20, 1889–July 8, 1966), was born in Arlington, Tennessee and grew up in Knoxville, Tennessee. Karnes entered active duty with the United States Army's 117th Regiment from the Tennessee National Guard during World War I. On October 8, 1918 Karnes' company was stopped near Estrées, France, by a German machine gun position. Karnes and Private Calvin John Ward, deciding they had "had all they could take" of this situation, fixed bayonets, charged and captured the position. This freed their company to advance against German lines in the last major offensive of the war. Both men received the Medal of Honor for extraordinary heroism in this action.

The Alcoa Highway (U.S. Route 129) bridge over the Tennessee River in Knoxville is named after Karnes.

Medal of Honor citation
Rank and organization: Sergeant, U.S. Army, Company D, 117th Infantry, 30th Division. Place and date: Near Estrees, France, October 8, 1918. Entered service at: Knoxville, Tenn. Born: 1889, Arlington, Tenn. G.O. No.: 50, W.D., 1919.

Citation:

During an advance, his company was held up by a machinegun, which was enfilading the line. Accompanied by another soldier, he advanced against this position and succeeded in reducing the nest by killing 3 and capturing 7 of the enemy and their guns.

See also

List of Medal of Honor recipients
List of Medal of Honor recipients for World War I

References

1889 births
1966 deaths
United States Army personnel of World War I
People from Knoxville, Tennessee
Military personnel from Tennessee
United States Army Medal of Honor recipients
United States Army non-commissioned officers
Recipients of the Silver Star
World War I recipients of the Medal of Honor
Place of death missing